Gmina Brody may refer to either of the following rural administrative districts in Poland:
Gmina Brody, Świętokrzyskie Voivodeship
Gmina Brody, Lubusz Voivodeship